Cerna is a village and a municipality in eastern Croatia.

Geography

It is located half-way between the cities of Vinkovci and Županja. It is located on four rivers, Biđ, Bosut, Berava, Bitulja, Krajc channel and Kaluđer channel.

Population

According to 2011 Croatian census it has 4,616 inhabitants in 2 settlements:
 Cerna - 3,791
 Šiškovci - 804

98.96% of the citizens are Croats.

History
One Scordisci archaeological site in Cerna dating back to late La Tène culture was excavated in the 1970s and 1980s as a part of rescue excavations in eastern Croatia. Archaeological site was a part of the settlement network of Scordisci in the area of Vinkovci.

See also
 Spačva basin

References

Municipalities of Croatia
Populated places in Syrmia
Populated places in Vukovar-Syrmia County
Archaeological sites in Croatia
La Tène culture